The 1922 season was the 39th season of regional competitive association football in Australia. It was also the year that the inaugural Australian soccer football team (later designated the 'Socceroos') toured New Zealand, where it played its first-ever 'A' international matches.

National teams

Australia men's national soccer team

Results and fixtures

Friendlies

League competitions

Cup competitions

(Note: figures in parentheses display the club's competition record as winners/runners-up.)

See also
 Soccer in Australia

References

Seasons in Australian soccer
1922 in Australian sport
Australian soccer by year
Australian soccer